The 1924–25 season was Chelsea Football Club's sixteenth competitive season.

Table

References

External links
 1924–25 season at stamford-bridge.com

1924–25
English football clubs 1924–25 season